The 1967 NCAA Skiing Championships were contested at Sugarloaf ski area in Carrabassett Valley, Maine at the 14th annual NCAA-sanctioned ski tournament to determine the individual and team national champions of men's collegiate alpine skiing, cross-country skiing, and ski jumping in the United States.

Denver, coached by Willy Schaeffler, captured their eleventh, and seventh consecutive, national championship, edging Wyoming by less than a point in the team standings.

No individual champions from the previous year repeated, but two reclaimed titles won two years earlier, Rick Chaffee (slalom) and Matz Jennsen (nordic).

Venue

This year's championships were held March 2–4 in Maine at Sugarloaf in Carrabassett Valley.

The fourteenth edition, these were the first championships in Maine and the fifth in the East; the previous eastern sites were in New Hampshire and Vermont.

Team scoring

Individual events

Four events were held, which yielded seven individual titles.
Thursday: Slalom
Friday: Downhill, Cross Country
Saturday: Jumping

See also
List of NCAA skiing programs

References

NCAA Skiing Championships
NCAA Skiing Championships
NCAA Skiing Championships
NCAA Skiing Championships
NCAA Skiing Championships
NCAA Skiing Championships
NCAA Skiing Championships
Skiing in Maine